Shiwiar, also known as Achuar, Jivaro and Maina, is a Chicham language spoken along the Pastaza and Bobonaza rivers in Ecuador. Shiwiar is one of the thirteen indigenous languages of Ecuador. All of these indigenous languages are endangered.

Speakers 
Shiwiar is a language spoken by the Achuar people of the Amazonian region of Ecuador. The Achuar people also speak Spanish, Shuar, and Kichwa along with their native language, Shiwiar. Shuar belongs to the same language family as Shiwiar – Jivaroan.

Although the Achuar live in the Amazon Basin, the extracting of oil and raw materials from Ecuador through mining has displaced the Achuar communities and endangered their homes.

While Ecuador's official language is Spanish, the Achuar people along with other indigenous groups have the right to use their own languages in education through the official language policies of Ecuador legalized in Decree No. 000529, Article 27, and the Dirección Nacional de Educación Indígena Intercultural Bilingüe (DINEIIB).

Phonology

  are phonetically central .
  (but not the long ) have the following allophones: open central unrounded , open-mid front unrounded , close-mid front unrounded  and close-mid back rounded .

References

Bibliography

External links

New Testament in Achuar

The Shiwiar Rainforest Initiative
Achuar–Shiwiar on Native Languages of the Americas
Listen to a sample of Achuar-Shiwiar from Global Recordings Network
OLAC resources in and about Achuar-Shiwiar

Chicham languages
Languages of Peru
Languages of Ecuador